John Joseph LaFalce (born October 6, 1939) is an American politician who served as a Congressman from the state of New York from 1975 to 2003. He retired in 2002 after his district was merged with that of a fellow Democrat.

LaFalce was first elected to the 94th United States Congress in 1974 and re-elected to each succeeding Congress through the 107th, serving his Western New York congressional district for 28 years, from 1975 to 2003. He served as Chairman of the House Small Business Committee from 1987 to 1995, and as Ranking Democrat on the House Financial Services Committee from 1999 to 2003. He declined to seek re-election to the 108th Congress.

Early life and education
LaFalce was born in Buffalo, New York, on October 6, 1939. He graduated Canisius High School before earning a bachelor's degree from Canisius College and J.D. degree from Villanova University School of Law.

Military service 
From 1965 to 1967, LaFalce served in the United States Army during the Vietnam era, leaving active duty with the rank of Captain. He returned from military service to practice law in Western New York with the law firm of Jaeckle, Fleischmann & Mugel, and soon became active in public service.

Career

State politics 
LaFalce was a member of the New York State Senate (53rd D.) in 1971 and 1972; and a member of the New York State Assembly (140th D.) in 1973 and 1974.

Congress 
In 1974, at the age of 35, LaFalce became the second Democrat, and the first since 1912, to win election to what was then the 36th congressional district of New York, which was based in Niagara Falls and also included much of northern Buffalo and the western suburbs of Rochester.  LaFalce was elected as part of the "Watergate babies", the large Democratic freshman class elected in the wake of Watergate.  He was reelected 13 times, rarely facing substantive opposition.

During his career in the House of Representatives, he served on both the Committee on Small Business and the Committee on Banking, Finance and Urban Affairs (now the Committee on Financial Services). In January 1987, he was elected by the Democratic Caucus as Chairman of the Committee on Small Business, thus becoming the first member of his class to chair a full, standing committee of the House. Following the change in control of Congress in 1994, he served as the committee's ranking Democrat. In February 1998, he was elected the ranking Democrat on the Financial Services Committee and served in that capacity through 2003.

LaFalce had numerous accomplishments as a legislator. For example, he is credited with initiating the Competitiveness Policy Council.

He crafted legislation that became the Financial Services Modernization Act of 1999 for which he and three other colleagues earned the American Financial Leadership Award from the Financial Services Roundtable. LaFalce also played a key leadership role in introducing and championing what ultimately became the Sarbanes-Oxley Act, signed by President Bush in July 2002.

LaFalce was generally a liberal Democrat, but strongly opposed abortion. He currently serves on the National Advisory Board of Democrats for Life of America.  He also was among a handful of Democratic members who voted against the five Iran sanction bills that passed  1997–2001.

After the 2000 census, New York lost two congressional districts. One plan called for the merger of LaFalce's territory with the neighboring 27th district of Republican Jack Quinn, a longtime friend who represented the other portion of Buffalo. The final map merged his district with the Rochester-based 28th District of fellow Democrat Louise Slaughter. The new district retained Slaughter's district number, but geographically was more LaFalce's district; indeed, only a narrow band of territory from Buffalo to Rochester connected the two areas. Nonetheless, LaFalce did not seek reelection in 2002.

Later career 

LaFalce served on the Board of Directors of State Bancorp, Inc., then parent company of State Bank of Long Island from 2007 to 2012.

LaFalce was Banking Board Member at the New York State Banking Department from 2008 to 2011.

He served as the Chairman and Director of Erie County Industrial Development Agency from April 1, 2012 to May 2013 and is a member of the advisory board to the Canadian American Business Council.

Personal life 
He is married to the former Patricia Fisher and they have one son, Martin, who is a graduate of Georgetown University Law Center and currently works as a public interest lawyer in New York City.

Honors

LaFalce received honorary Doctor of Laws degrees from Villanova University School of Law (1991), St. John's University (1989), and Niagara University (1979), as well as an honorary Doctor of Humane Letters from Canisius College (1990).

References

External links

 

|-

|-

1939 births
Living people
Democratic Party New York (state) state senators
Democratic Party members of the New York State Assembly
United States Army officers
Villanova University School of Law alumni
Canisius College alumni
Politicians from Buffalo, New York
American people of Italian descent
Democratic Party members of the United States House of Representatives from New York (state)
21st-century American politicians
Members of Congress who became lobbyists